Saint Lewina (or Lewinna, Levinna, Lewine, Leofwynn; 7th century) was a British virgin and martyr who was put to death by Saxon invaders.
Her feast day is 25 July.

Life

Little is known of Lewinna's life.
One source says she was a British woman who lived during the reign of King Ecgberht of Kent (r. 664–673).
As a virgin, she was killed by a Saxon heathen due to her faith during the life of Archbishop Theodore of Tarsus (died 690).
She was buried at a monastery in Sussex dedicated to Saint Andrew.
Possibly Saint Lewinna's name is connected with that of the town of Lewes, which once had a church of Saint Andrew and is near Seaford.
Lewinna may be the Latin version of Leofwynn, a Saxon rather than British name.
She has been associated with Bishopstone, also near Seaford.

A Benedictine monk called Drogo from the abbey of Bergues in Flanders wrote a lengthy account of the removal of Lewina's relics in 1058 by another monk of Bergues named Balgerus.
Balgerus sailed in a merchant vessel to England, and after riding out a storm landed in Sevordt (Seaford).
He heard of the miracles wrought by the saint, and after struggling with his conscience stole her relics and took them to his ship.
They were carried to the monastery at Bergues and stored in a chest adorned with gold and silver.
In 1522 they were destroyed during some religious disturbances.

Monks of Ramsgate account

The monks of St Augustine's Abbey, Ramsgate wrote in their Book of Saints (1921),

Dunbar's account

Agnes Baillie Cunninghame Dunbar (1830–1920) in her Dictionary of Saintly Women (1904) wrote,

Butler's account

The hagiographer Alban Butler (1710–1773) wrote in his Lives of the Fathers, Martyrs, and Other Principal Saints, under July 24,

Notes

Sources

 
 
 

 

Romano-British saints
7th-century deaths
7th-century Christian saints
Female saints of medieval England
7th-century English women